A smoke ring is a region of pink colored meat in the outermost 8-10 millimeters of smoked meats. It is usually seen on smoked chicken, pork, and beef.  There is some debate as to whether or not the presence of the smoke ring is actually an indicator of quality of the finished barbecue product but it is widely considered to be a desirable characteristic of barbecue.

Occurrence 
The pinkish color in meat is typically due to the presence of a compound called myoglobin. Myoglobin typically darkens and turns brown when heated above a certain temperature. This is why the perimeter of a cooked steak is darker in color than the red inside; as the lower temperature of the middle of the steak was not sufficient to cause the myoglobin to lose its pigment.  

When smoking meat, a different process occurs than in other cooking methods.  Organic fuels such as wood and charcoal, when burned, produce nitrogen dioxide gas.  When this gas dissolves into the meat, it reacts with the hydrogen molecules and becomes nitric oxide (NO).  The NO combined with the myoglobin form a stable pink molecule that does not denature in the heat.  The depth of the smoke ring is determined by how far the smoke can permeate into the meat.

In a smoker 
There are several considerations when smoking meat that will determine the extent at which a smoke ring will form. The highest concentrations of atmospheric  can be achieved in a smoker through the utilization of charcoal briquets, or wood fires; both of which are capable of producing up to 200ppm (parts per million)  in the cooking chamber. It has been suggested that greener woods produce more , but are less suitable for cooking.

Cooking "low and slow" is said to be key in the development of a smoke ring. For this reason, keeping the exterior of the meat moist via basting or spritzing is often recommended.

Artificially 
Methods exist to achieve a smoke ring on cooked meats that can be achieved outside of a smoker (or utilized when a propane or electric smoker are used).  Marinating or soaking meats in curing salts is one methodology to cure the exterior layers of meat (in similar fashion to how a ham is cured) and cause the perimeter of the meat to remain pink throughout the cooking process.

See also

 List of smoked foods

References 

Cooking techniques
Smoked meat